Kara Project was a 2014 South Korean reality television program starring the girl group Kara. It aired on MBC Music from May 27 – 1 July 2014.

The program centred around the search to find a new member of Kara, following the departure of its members Nicole and Jiyoung. Seven trainees from DSP Media participated in the show, competing to become part of the group. The winner of the competition was Heo Young-ji, who became Kara's new member.

On February 24, 2015, contestant Ahn So-jin was found to have died from apparent suicide one month after DSP ended their contract with her. She had been a trainee for five years before participating in Kara Project.

Contestants

Results

References

External links 
 Kara - Official Website 

South Korean reality television series
2014 South Korean television series debuts
2014 South Korean television series endings
Korean-language television shows
Kara (South Korean group)